The following is a list of the 34 communes of the Martinique overseas department of France.

The communes cooperate in the following intercommunalities (as of 2020):
Communauté d'agglomération du Centre de la Martinique
Communauté d'agglomération de l'Espace Sud de la Martinique
Communauté d'agglomération du Pays Nord Martinique

References

Martinique
 
Martinique 3